The 2011 Lamar Cardinals football team represented Lamar University in the 2011 NCAA Division I FCS football season. The Cardinals were led by second-year head coach Ray Woodard and played their home games at Provost Umphrey Stadium. They are a member of the Southland Conference. This was the first season Lamar played as a Southland Conference member in football since 1986. They finished the season 4–7, 2–5 in Southland play to finish in sixth place.

Schedule

References

Lamar
Lamar Cardinals football seasons
Lamar Cardinals football